The right to freedom of religion in the United Kingdom is provided for in all three constituent legal systems, by devolved, national, European, and international law and treaty. Four constituent nations compose the United Kingdom, resulting in an inconsistent religious character, and there is no state church for the whole kingdom.

Laws guaranteeing freedom of religion

European Convention on Human Rights 

The ECHR guarantees in Article 9 that subjects will have:

Human Rights Act 
The right is given in the United Kingdom by s. 1 ss. (1)(a) of the Human Rights Act 1998 (HRA), as the "right and fundamental freedom".

United Nations General Assembly 

In Article 18 of the International Covenant on Civil and Political Rights, which was adopted by the United Nations General Assembly in resolution 2200A (XXI) on 16 December 1966, the UN resolved that:

The United Nations Human Rights Committee, a sub-body of the General Assembly, also resolved in General comment 22 on 30 July 1993 that the right to freedom of religion applies to unconventional or extra-institutional religions, as well as atheist or anti-clerical beliefs:

Monarchy 
The Act of Settlement 1701 decrees that the monarch of Great Britain (later the United Kingdom) "shall join in communion with the Church of England". This act was specifically designed to prevent a Catholic monarch from ascending to the throne, but in effect discriminates against all religions other than Protestantism. Members of the Royal family in line of succession who married a Roman Catholic (though not adherents of other denominations or faiths) were excluded from the succession. Under the provisions of the Succession to the Crown Act 2013, marrying a Roman Catholic no longer disqualifies a person from succeeding to the Crown; however, the provision of the Act of Settlement requiring the monarch to be a Protestant continues unrepealed.

Churches with special status

Church of England 
In England, the state church is the Church of England, and the Supreme Governor of the church is the British Monarch.  As already mentioned, the monarch is required to "join in communion with the Church of England".  As part of the coronation ceremony, the monarch swears an oath to "maintain and preserve inviolably the settlement of the Church of England, and the doctrine, worship, discipline, and government thereof, as by law established in England" before being crowned by the senior cleric of the Church, the Archbishop of Canterbury.  All clergy of the Church swear an oath of allegiance to the monarch before taking office.

Parliament has authority to govern the Church of England, but, since 1919 has generally delegated this authority to that Church's General Synod (earlier called the Church Assembly).  Parliament retains the ability to veto measures of the General Synod or Church Assembly; this rarely invoked power was used in 1927 and 1928 to prevent adoption of a revised prayer book.  Measures also require royal assent.

The appointment of bishops and archbishops of the Church falls within the royal prerogative. In current practice, the Prime Minister makes the choice from two candidates submitted by a commission of prominent Church members, then passes his choice on to the monarch.  The Prime Minister plays this role even though they themself are not required to be a member of the Church of England or even a Christian—for example Clement Attlee was an agnostic who described himself as "incapable of religious feeling".

Although it is an established church, the Church of England receives no state funding.  Instead, the Church relies on donations, land and investments.

Church of Scotland
Since the Church of Scotland Act 1921, the Church of Scotland has been independent from the state.  The monarch does, however, take an oath to preserve the Church of Scotland at the meeting of the Privy Council immediately following his or her accession.  The monarch also has the right to attend the General Assembly of the Church of Scotland, but usually sends a High Commissioner in his or her place.

Church in Wales
Since 1920, the Church in Wales has been independent of the state.  The church is, however, legally required to perform opposite-sex marriages where at least one of those being married has resided in one of its parishes for six months (a similar requirement applies to the Church of England).

Adoption agencies 

The Equality Act 2006 is applied equally to religious-based and secular adoption agencies. The Catholic adoption agencies unsuccessfully attempted to negotiate a compromise that would include an exemption for religious-based agencies, which would have allowed them to continue to facilitate adoption for opposite-sex parents only.

Education 

Several university student associations have implemented rules that require affiliated groups to allow "anybody, regardless of faith, ethnicity or sexuality, to sit on their ruling committees and to address their meetings."  However some Christian Unions say they should be allowed to require that their ruling committees share their beliefs.

Service provision 

In May 2008, Lillian Ladele, a registrar from Islington, London, took her employer, Islington London Borough Council, to the London Central Employment Tribunal, with the financial backing of the Christian Institute. Ladele had refused to conduct civil partnerships on religious grounds, and following complaints from other staff she was disciplined under the Council's Fairness for All policy. Ladele claimed she had been subject to direct and indirect discrimination, and harassment in the workplace, on grounds of her religion.   In July 2008, the tribunal found in Ladele's favour, however this ruling was overturned by the Employment Appeal Tribunal in December, 2008.

In 2011 a judge ruling on a bed and breakfast refusing to accommodate unmarried couples found in favour of a gay couple under the Equality Act 2010 but allowed an appeal, commenting that the ruling: 'does affect the human rights of the defendants to manifest their religion'.

History 

Due to the United Kingdom having been formed by the union of previously independent states from 1707, most of the largest religious groups do not have UK-wide organisational structures.

The Oath of Supremacy, originally imposed by King Henry VIII of England through the Act of Supremacy 1534, required any person taking public or church office in England to swear allegiance to the monarch as Supreme Governor of the Church of England. Roman Catholics who refused to take the Oath of Supremacy were indicted for treason on charges of praemunire.

The Toleration Act 1688 granted freedom of worship to nonconformists who had pledged to the oaths of Allegiance and Supremacy and rejected transubstantiation, i.e., to Protestants who dissented from the Church of England such as Baptists, Congregationalists or English Presbyterians. The Act intentionally did not apply to Roman Catholics, Jews, nontrinitarians, and atheists.

Blasphemy law 

The common law offence of blasphemy was repealed in 2008. The last person to be imprisoned for blasphemy in the UK was John William Gott in 1922, for comparing Jesus Christ to a clown. The next blasphemy case was in 1977, when Mary Whitehouse brought a private prosecution (Whitehouse v. Lemon) against the editor of Gay News for blasphemous libel after he published a poem by James Kirkup called "The Love That Dares to Speak Its Name". Denis Lemon was given a nine-month suspended sentence and a £500 fine for publishing the "most scurrilous profanity" which portrayed the sexual love of a Roman centurion for the body of Christ on the cross. The sentence was upheld on appeal.

In this appeal case, Lord Scarman held that the modern law of blasphemy was correctly formulated in Article 214 of Stephen's Digest of the Criminal Law, 9th edition (1950). This states as follows:

In 1996 the European Court of Human Rights (case #19/1995/525/611) upheld a ban on Visions of Ecstasy, an erotic video about a 16th-century nun, based on the video infringing on the blasphemy law. The Court estimated that a limited ban on vulgar or obscene publications that would be offensive to believers, while keeping legal the criticism of religion, was compatible with the principles of a democratic society.

On May 8, 2008 the offence of blasphemy was abolished.  However, some acts that were once viewed as blasphemous may now be prosecutable under other legislation, such as the Public Order Act 1986 as amended by the Racial and Religious Hatred Act 2006.

See also
Christian Legal Centre

Footnotes 

Religion in the United Kingdom
Law of the United Kingdom
United Kingdom
Human rights in the United Kingdom